XHDU-FM (98.9 FM) is a regional Mexican radio station in Durango City, Durango, Mexico. It is owned by Armas Radio and known as La que le Gusta a Usted.

History

XEDU-AM 860 received its first concession, then for 1400 kHz, in March 1943, and it signed on December 18, 1944. By the 1960s, XEDU broadcast on 860 kHz. It migrated to FM in 2011.

External links
 Official website

References

1944 establishments in Mexico
Mass media in Durango City
Radio stations established in 1944
Radio stations in Durango
Regional Mexican radio stations
Spanish-language radio stations